The 2005–06 season was Villarreal Club de Fútbol's 83rd season in existence and the club's 6th consecutive season in the top flight of Spanish football. In addition to the domestic league, Villarreal participated in this season's editions of the Copa del Rey and the UEFA Champions League. The season covered the period from 1 July 2005 to 30 June 2006.

Season summary
Villarreal reached the semi-finals of the UEFA Champions League, being knocked out by eventual runners-up Arsenal 1-0 on aggregate, with Arsenal keeper Jens Lehmann saving a last-minute Juan Román Riquelme penalty, in the second leg, that would have taken the tie to extra time in front of Villarreal's home support.

Despite Villarreal's excellent form in Europe, the continental success was not translated to the domestic stage. Villarreal finished seventh, consigning them to Intertoto Cup football.

Squad
Squad at end of season

Left club during season

Competitions

Overall record

La Liga

League table

Results summary

Results by round

Matches

Copa del Rey

Round of 16

UEFA Champions League

Third qualifying round

Group stage

Knockout phase

Round of 16

Quarter-finals

Semi-finals

Notes and references

Notes

References

Villarreal CF seasons
Villarreal